This is a list of fictional monarchs appearing in the genealogies of three Korean descent groups: the Cheongju Han, the Haengju Gi, and the Taewon Seonu. These groups claim descent from  a line of putative kings of Gojoseon and Mahan founded by the legendary Chinese figure Jizi, who is said to have introduced Chinese civilization to Korea. However, the association between Jizi and these clans is considered an Early Modern fabrication. The records of the Goryeo dynasty make no link between Cheongju Han individuals and Jizi, despite the fact that the official veneration of Jizi as a culture hero was patronized by the state. Fifteenth- and sixteenth-century sources also report that the descent group had been founded either by Han Ran(한란,韓蘭), a tenth-century general in the service of Taejo of Goryeo, or by Han Gang(한강,韓康), a thirteenth-century minister in the government of Gojong of Goryeo.

In the case of the Cheongju Han, the creation of the myth appears to have involved the integration of reports from the third-century Chinese history Weilüe, in which King Jun is said to have fled south and proclaimed himself King of "Han" after losing his throne to a Chinese usurper, and the Jewang ungi, a thirteenth-century epic poem in which King Jun is said to have become the king of Mahan. However, the histories never actually state that King Jun was a descendant of Jizi. The genealogies claim that King Jun's descendants ruled Mahan for a while before losing the throne, at which point the last king's three sons scattered to the Three Kingdoms of Korea and founded the Han, Gi, and Seonu.

The first evidence of Koreans claiming descent from Jizi and the Gojoseon kings appears in a Joseon Veritable Records entry for September 1603, when a discussion about Jizi between King Seonjo and his ministers digressed into a discussion on whether Jizi had traceable living descendants. The ministers, such as Yun Geun-su, reported that it was said that the Cheongju Han and the Taewon Seonu were descended from Jizi; the king remained skeptical. Surviving writing by Yun Geun-su himself suggests considerable personal doubt as to the veracity of the Cheongju Han's claims.

Seonjo's successor, Gwanghaegun, significantly supported the state veneration of Jizi amid an environment in which claiming Chinese descent became increasingly prestigious following Ming China's successful interventions to save Korea during the 1590s Japanese invasions. In particular, the supposed descendants of Jizi were now legally relieved from the military cloth tax(군포,軍布) that Koreans were obliged to pay in place of conscription. As a result, many unrelated descent groups changed their affiliation to those descended from Jizi, with the result that groups such as the Jindo Han clan or the Jinan Han clan vanished. Descent from Jizi became generally accepted in Korean society following the publication of genealogies in the early seventeenth century, although major Korean scholars, in particular of the Silhak strain of practical scholarship, continued to question the connection. Modern Korean historians do not accept the historical validity of the genealogies.

Gojoseon (Gija joseon)

Mahan

기준 (箕準) or King Mugang 무강왕 武康王 (220–194BCE)
기탁 (箕卓) or King Gang 강왕 康王 (193–189BCE)
기감 (箕龕) or King An 안왕 安王 (189–157BCE)
기식 (箕寔) or King Hye 혜왕 惠王 (157–144BCE)
기무 (箕武) or King Myung 명왕 明王 (144–113BCE)
기형 (箕亨) or King Hyo 효왕 孝王 (113–73BCE)
기섭 (箕燮) or King Yang 양왕 襄王 (73–58BCE)
기훈 (箕勳) or King Won 원왕 元王 (58–32BCE)
기정 (箕貞) or King Gye 계왕 稽王 (32–17BCE)

See also
List of monarchs of Korea

References

Citations

Works cited

 
 

Korean mythology